Edward Snyder, also known as Edward J. Snyder, (1895 – July 10, 1982) was an American cameraman, cinematographer (director of photography), and visual effects/special effects artist.  Born in New York City in 1895, Snyder would break into the film industry as the Director of Photography on the 1926 silent film, The Fighting Marine, which featured the only screen performance by boxing heavyweight champion, Gene Tunney. He would be one of the plethora of talented cameramen to work on the Howard Hughes' 1930 aerial classic, Hell's Angels, along with such other notable cameramen and future directors of photography, Paul Ivano, Henry Cronjager and Ernest Laszlo.  But it was as special effects artist that he would have his greatest success, working on such classic films as Otto Preminger's Laura; George Cukor's Winged Victory; The Keys of the Kingdom, starring Gregory Peck; Elia Kazan's A Tree Grows in Brooklyn; Anna and the King of Siam, starring Irene Dunne and Rex Harrison; and 1948's Deep Waters, for which he was nominated for an Academy Award (losing to the special effects team of Portrait of Jennie). Snyder died in 1982.

Filmography
(as per AFI's database)

References

External links
 
 

American cinematographers
American filmmakers
1895 births
1982 deaths
Special effects people
Visual effects artists